The Acartophthalmidae are a family of very small (1.0-2.5 mm), dark flies with pubescent arista, placed in the order Diptera. All are Holarctic in distribution. Two fossil species are known, with uncertain placement.

Genera
†Acartophthalmites Hennig, 1965
Acartophthalmus Czerny, 1902

Biology
Adults have been found mostly in forests. Larvae have been reared from dead wood and decaying organic material.

References

 
Brachycera families
Taxa named by Leander Czerny